Deniz Mujić (born 7 August 1990) is an Austrian footballer of Bosnian descent who plays as a midfielder or forward for Liechtensteiner club Eschen/Mauren.

Career
In January 2014, he joined the reserve team of FC St. Gallen. On 8 January 2016, je joined FC Schaffhausenj on loan until the end of the 2015–16 season. On 29 July 2016, he extended his contract at FC St. Gallen until 2018 and was loaned to FC Chiasso for the 2016–17 season.

Mujic signed with FC Gossau in the summer of 2018.

In June 2022, Mujić moved to Eschen/Mauren in Liechtenstein, the club that plays in the Swiss league system, specifically in the fourth-tier 1. Liga at that time.

References

External links
 
 
 Profile at FC Gossau

1990 births
People from Dornbirn
Footballers from Vorarlberg
Austrian people of Bosnia and Herzegovina descent
Living people
Austrian footballers
Austria youth international footballers
Association football midfielders
Association football forwards
FC Bayern Munich II players
FC Juniors OÖ players
FC Dornbirn 1913 players
SW Bregenz players
FC St. Gallen players
FC Schaffhausen players
FC Chiasso players
FC Balzers players
FC Gossau players
SC Brühl players
USV Eschen/Mauren players
3. Liga players
2. Liga (Austria) players
Swiss Challenge League players
Swiss Promotion League players
Swiss 1. Liga (football) players
Austrian expatriate footballers
Expatriate footballers in Germany
Austrian expatriate sportspeople in Germany
Expatriate footballers in Switzerland
Austrian expatriate sportspeople in Switzerland
Expatriate footballers in Liechtenstein
Austrian expatriate sportspeople in Liechtenstein